The following is a list of arenas ordered by seating capacity, which is the maximum number of seated spectators the arena can accommodate for a sports event. Only the capacity for indoor sports, such as basketball, ice hockey, and volleyball, are included. Currently all arenas with a capacity of 15,000 or more are included.

Venues are only included if they are designed primarily for sports traditionally held indoors. Venues built for field sports that also host indoor events are not included. Such venues include, but are not limited to:
 AT&T Stadium (Arlington, Texas, USA), a retractable-roof venue built for the Dallas Cowboys (American football).
 Carrier Dome (Syracuse, New York, USA), a domed venue built for multiple sports teams at Syracuse University.
 Caesars Superdome (New Orleans, Louisiana, USA), a domed venue built for the New Orleans Saints (American football).
 Paris La Défense Arena (Nanterre, France), a domed venue built for Racing 92 (rugby union).
 Stade Pierre-Mauroy (Lille, France), a retractable-roof venue built for Lille OSC (association football).

Some of the above venues have hosted some of the largest crowds in history for indoor sports. The Caesars Superdome, for example, regularly seats more than 70,000 for basketball games (NCAA and NBA), boxing (over 65,000 for the Ali-Spinks Rematch), and more than 75,000 for professional wrestling.  In 1981 the Rolling Stones reported Superdome attendance of 87,500 for a concert, while Pope John Paul II spoke to a crowd of more than 80,000 children in 1987. The largest confirmed attendance for a basketball game (108,713) was at AT&T Stadium (then known as Cowboys Stadium) for the 2010 NBA All-Star Game.

By contrast, Saitama Super Arena in the Japanese city of the same name is included because it was built primarily for indoor sports, although it can be configured to host field sports. (Both it and Paris La Défense Arena have movable seating blocks that can adapt to either an arena or field configuration.)

The confusion of what is an Arena, Stadium or Dome is due to the fact that opinion and other arbitrary criteria that do not matter have been considered. Thus, there are no significant differences in the true definition between the three because each has incorporated design elements of the others, other than size and limitation of use of the space by original design. The best modern definition of an Arena is an indoor venue that typically holds less than 40,000 spectators.  Domed and Indoor Stadiums for the most part are the same thing but hold more than 40,000 spectators. However, there is a strong push to separate removable roof/ sliding roof as a specific identifier for Dome venues.  Architecturally, there really is no difference between an Indoor Stadium and a Domed Stadium other than the roof can be opened in good weather.

The list is divided into three subsections: current arenas, arenas under construction, and arenas which are closed no longer used for sporting events.

Current arenas

Arenas under construction

Closed arenas

See also
List of indoor arenas in Africa
List of indoor arenas in Argentina 
List of indoor arenas in Brazil
List of indoor arenas in Canada 
List of indoor arenas in Europe 
List of indoor arenas in the Philippines
List of indoor arenas in the United Kingdom
List of indoor arenas in the United States 
List of association football stadiums by capacity
List of European stadiums by capacity

References

Indoor arenas